Salonen is a Finnish surname. Notable people with the surname include:

Brian Salonen (born 1961), former American football tight end
Esa-Pekka Salonen (born 1958), Finnish orchestral conductor and composer
Juha Salonen (born 1961), Finnish judoka
Kristiina Salonen (born 1977), Finnish politician
Neil Albert Salonen (born 1946), president of the University of Bridgeport
Pauli Salonen (1916–2009), Finnish Nordic combined skier
Reima Salonen (born 1955), retired race walker from Finland
Satu Salonen (born 1973), former Finnish cross country skier
Timo Salonen (born 1951), Finnish former rally driver, 1985 world champion for Peugeot
Toivo Salonen (born 1933), former speed skater from Finland

Finnish-language surnames